Micromyrtus hymenonema is a plant species of the family Myrtaceae endemic to Western Australia.

It blooms between June and October producing purple-pink flowers.

It is found on sand dunes and sand plains in the central eastern Goldfields-Esperance region of Western Australia where it grows in sandy soils.

References

hymenonema
Flora of Western Australia
Plants described in 1931
Taxa named by Ferdinand von Mueller